Peptidyl arginine deiminase, type I, also known as PADI1, is a protein which in humans is encoded by the PADI1 gene.

This gene encodes a member of the peptidyl arginine deiminase family of enzymes, which catalyze the post-translational deimination of proteins by converting arginine residues into citrullines in the presence of calcium ions. The family members have distinct substrate specificities and tissue-specific expression patterns. The type I enzyme is involved in the late stages of epidermal differentiation, where it deiminates filaggrin and keratin K1, which maintains hydration of the stratum corneum, and hence the cutaneous barrier function. This enzyme may also play a role in hair follicle formation. This gene exists in a cluster with four other paralogous genes.

References

Further reading